Cuigezhuang Area is an area and township located in northern Chaoyang District, Beijing, China. It is at the south of Sunhe Township, west of Dongba and Jinzhan Townships, north of Jiuxianqiao Subdistrict and Jiangtai Township, east of Wangjing, Donghu Subdistrict and Laiguangying Township. As of 2020, the population of Cuigezhuang was 107,029.

The name Cuigezhuang was from a local village  where the current township government resides.

History

Administrative Divisions 
By the end of 2021, there were 22 subdivisions inside Cuigezhuang, where 7 were communities and 15 were villages:

See also 
 List of township-level divisions of Beijing

References

Chaoyang District, Beijing
Areas of Beijing